Mill Creek is a neighborhood in the West Philadelphia section of Philadelphia, Pennsylvania. It sits between 44th and 52nd Streets north of Market Street and south of Girard Avenue. It is named for the eponymous creek which was buried in a pipe in the 19th century. 

In 1961, the sewer collapsed, taking homes with it.

The neighborhood was formerly home to Mill Creek Apartments, a public housing project designed by Louis Kahn in the early 1950s. Its three 17-story highrise project towers were demolished in 2002 and replaced with suburban-style low-rise houses, a development named Lucien Blackwell Homes after the congressman.

Mill Creek was the site of the 2000 "Lex Street Massacre," in which four men killed seven others and wounded three in retaliation for damage to a car, Philadelphia's worst killing spree in modern history.

The Rudolph Blankenburg School, the Mayer Sulzberger Junior High School,  and Institute of the Pennsylvania Hospital are listed on the National Register of Historic Places.

References

External links
 PHA's Lucien Blackwell Homes
 Restoring Mill Creek: Landscape Literacy, Environmental Justice, City Planning and Design, Anne Whiston Spirn
 Tearing Down Louis Kahn, New York Times

Neighborhoods in Philadelphia
West Philadelphia